Bolshaya Orlovka is a rural locality in Vyshnederevensky Selsoviet Rural Settlement, Lgovsky District, Kursk Oblast, Russia. Population:

Geography 
The village is located on the Byk River (a left tributary of the Seym), 40 km from the Russia–Ukraine border, 65 km south-west of Kursk, 9 km south-east of the district center – the town Lgov, 1.5 km from the selsoviet center – Vyshniye Derevenki.

 Climate
Bolshaya Orlovka has a warm-summer humid continental climate (Dfb in the Köppen climate classification).

Transport 

The rural locality is situated 72 km from Kursk Vostochny Airport, 136 km from Belgorod International Airport and 273 km from Voronezh Peter the Great Airport.

References

Notes

Sources

Rural localities in Lgovsky District